Ólína Kjerúlf Þorvarðardóttir (born 8 September 1958) was a member of the Althing, representing the Social Democratic Alliance for the Northwest Constituency from 2009 to 2016.

Life and career
Ólína has been an active scholar in social Sciences, a principal of the Junior College of Ísafjörður (Menntaskólinn á Ísafirði) from 2001 to 2006; and lecturer at the University of Iceland (Folklore, Icelandic literature) from 1992 to 2000. Before participating in politics, Ólína worked as a journalist, reporter and TV-anchor at the State Broadcasting Station (RÚV) from 1987 to 1990.

Ólína has published several books and articles on political and social matters. She is an active rescue team volunteer for Slysavarnafélagið Landsbjörg where she specializes in training and working with rescue dogs.

Parliamentary Committees
 Member of the Committee on the Environment (2009–2016; also chairman 2010–2016).
 Vice-chairman of the Committee on Fisheries and Agriculture (2009–2016; also vice-chairman 2009–2016).
 Member of the Committee on Transport and Communications (2010–2016).
 Chairman of the Icelandic delegation to the West Nordic Council (2009–2016).
 Chairman of The West Nordic Council (2010–2016).
 Member of the Committee on Social Affairs and Social Security (2009–2010).

SAR
Ólína is a volunteer member of the Icelandic Association for Search and Rescue (ICE-SAR). In January 2020, she was part of an around 200 SAR members who rescued 49 people at the base of Langjökull glacier.

Published books

References

External links
Official website

Living people
1958 births
Olina Thorvardardottir
Olina Thorvardardottir
Olina Thorvardardottir
Olina Thorvardardottir
21st-century Icelandic women writers